Kasota was laid down as YT-222; launched 20 January 1944 by the Elizabeth City Shipyard, Elizabeth City, N.C.; sponsored by Miss Norma Crawley; and reclassified YTB-222 15 May 1944 prior to being placed in service 4 September for duty in the 5th Naval District. Kasota operated out of Norfolk as a district and service craft until 1 May 1961 when she was struck from the Navy List.

References 
 
 NavSource Online: Service Ship Photo Archive Kasota (YTB-222)

 

Tugs of the United States Navy
Ships built in Elizabeth City, North Carolina
1944 ships